L-733,060 is a drug developed by Merck which acts as an orally active, non-peptide, selective antagonist for the NK1 receptor, binding with a Ki of 0.08 nM. Only one enantiomer is active which has made it the subject of several asymmetric synthesis efforts.

L-733,060 has antidepressant and anxiolytic effects in animal studies, and reduces both the dopamine release and neurotoxicity produced by methamphetamine and cocaine. It shows anti-inflammatory and anti-hepatotoxic effects in animals, and counteracts the development of hyperalgesia following nerve injury. It also has anticancer effects in a variety of in vitro models.

See also 

 NK1 receptor antagonists
 Aprepitant
 Casopitant
 Fosaprepitant
 Maropitant
 Vestipitant
 Vofopitant

References 

Antidepressants
Anxiolytics
NK1 receptor antagonists
Piperidines
Ethers
Trifluoromethyl compounds
Experimental drugs